Sukhaya Veret is a rural locality (a village) in Zadneselskoye Rural Settlement, Ust-Kubinsky District, Vologda Oblast, Russia. The population was 4 as of 2002.

Geography 
Sukhaya Veret is located 36 km north of Ustye (the district's administrative centre) by road. Sholokhovo is the nearest rural locality.

References 

Rural localities in Tarnogsky District